Michael or Mike Clifford may refer to:

 Michael Clifford (journalist), Irish author and journalist
 Michael Clifford (musician) (born 1995), Australian guitarist, bandmember of 5 Seconds of Summer
 Michael R. Clifford (1952–2021), American army officer and astronaut
 Michael B. Clifford, British filmmaker
 Michael K. Clifford, American education investor and advisor
 Mike Clifford (born 1943), American singer